St. Antoninus Church is a Roman Catholic parish church located at 337 South Orange Avenue within the Archdiocese of Newark, in Newark, New Jersey.

History
The parish was founded in 1875, and was run by clergy of the Dominican Order until just after its 100th anniversary in 1975. Since that time the church has been run by members of the Catholic Charismatic Renewal movement. 
The present church building dates to 1882, and once contained a main sanctuary (still in use today), and a smaller sanctuary on the lower level of the church building. The "lower church" was largely unused since the late 1960s and was renovated into a community room in the mid 1980s.

The church today serves as a regional base for the Catholic Charismatic Renewal movement, hosting a number of retreats throughout the year, as well as being a parish for its immediate neighborhood. The Gratia Plena Evangelical Community is based at the church, and the former Monastery of St. Dominic is now home to members of the Franciscan Friars of the Renewal.
The former Monastery is now known as the Most Blessed Sacrament Friary.

The parish provided clergy support to the nearby Monastery of St. Dominic until the monastery closed in the early 2000s.

References

External links 
 
 oldnewark.com
 parishesonline.com
 newarkfriary.org
 NYT article

Roman Catholic churches in Newark, New Jersey
Roman Catholic churches in New Jersey
1875 establishments in New Jersey